Peshkov (Czech: Peškov) is a Russian masculine surname originating from the masculine given name Pyotr (Peter). Its feminine counterpart is Peshkova (Czech: Pešková). It may refer to:
Aleksandr Peshkov (born 1972), Russian naval officer
Igor Peshkov (born 1965), Kazakhstani judoka
Kristian Peshkov (born 1996), Bulgarian football player 
Maxim Gorky (born Aleksey Peshkov; 1868–1936), Russian writer and political activist
Nadezhda Peshkova (1901–1971), Russian painter
Yekaterina Peshkova (1887–1965), Russian human rights activist
Zinovy Peshkov (1884–1966), Russian-born French general and diplomat
Daniela Pešková (born 1984), Slovak sports shooter
Eliška Pešková (1833–1895), Czech stage actor and playwright
Vlasta Pešková (born 1938), Czech javelin thrower

See also
Peskov

References

Russian-language surnames